Chiragh Kumar (born 15 December 1983) is an Indian professional golfer.

Kumar won a silver medal as an amateur at the 2006 Asian Games, before turning professional later that year and joining the Professional Golf Tour of India. In 2011 he won three times, was the leading money-winner on tour and was named tour player of the year.

At the 2011 Hero Honda Indian Open, an Asian Tour event, Kumar was the halfway leader and went on to finish second to David Gleeson in the tournament. His winnings from the event would see him end the year 21st on the Asian Tour Order of Merit, giving him a full tour card for the first time.

Professional wins (5)

Asian Tour wins (1)

1Co-sanctioned by the Professional Golf Tour of India

Professional Golf Tour of India wins (5)

1Co-sanctioned by the Asian Tour

Team appearances
Amateur
Asian Games: 2006

References

External links

Indian male golfers
Asian Tour golfers
Asian Games medalists in golf
Asian Games silver medalists for India
Golfers at the 2006 Asian Games
Medalists at the 2006 Asian Games
Golfers from Delhi
1983 births
Living people